The Battle of Sedgemoor was the last and decisive engagement between the Kingdom of England and rebels led by the Duke of Monmouth during the Monmouth rebellion, fought on 6 July 1685, and took place at Westonzoyland near Bridgwater in Somerset, England, resulting in a victory for the English army.

It was the final battle of the Monmouth Rebellion and followed a series of skirmishes around south-west England between the rebel forces of the Duke of Monmouth, and the Royal Army still loyal to James II. Victory went to the Government and about 500 prisoners fell into their hands. Monmouth escaped from the battlefield but was captured, taken to London and executed nine days later. Many of Monmouth's supporters were tried during the Bloody Assizes. Many were transported abroad, while others were executed by drawing and quartering.

Background

It was the final battle of the Monmouth Rebellion, by which the rebel James Scott, 1st Duke of Monmouth, attempted to seize the English throne from his uncle James II of England. James II had succeeded to the throne on the death of his brother Charles II on 2 February 1685; James Scott was Charles' illegitimate son.

After Monmouth landed from the Dutch Republic at Lyme Regis in Dorset, there had been a series of marches and skirmishes throughout Dorset and Somerset. Eventually Monmouth's poorly equipped army was pushed back to the Somerset Levels, becoming hemmed in at Bridgwater on 3 July. He ordered his troops to fortify the town. The force was made up of around 3,500, mostly nonconformist, artisans and farm workers armed with farm tools (such as pitchforks).

The royalist troops, led by Louis de Duras, 2nd Earl of Feversham, and Colonel John Churchill, were camped behind the Bussex Rhine at Westonzoyland. The infantry forces included 500 men of the 1st Regiment of Foot (the Royal Scots), known as Dumbarton's Regiment, under Lieutenant-Colonel Douglas; two battalions of the 1st or King's Royal Regiment of Guards (Grenadier Guards), respectively led by Henry FitzRoy, 1st Duke of Grafton and Major Eaton; 600 men of the Second Regiment of Guards (later the Coldstream Guards) under Lieutenant-Colonel Sackville; five companies of the Queen Dowager's or the Tangier Regiment (later 2nd Foot), known as "Kirke's Lambs"; and five companies of the Queen Consort's Regiment (Kings Own Royal Regiment), also known as Trelawny's Regiment, which was commanded by Lieutenant-Colonel Charles Churchill, Colonel John Churchill's younger brother. The Horse and Foot, the Royal Train of Artillery was camped along the road to Bridgwater. The Royal Cavalry, with seven troops of 420 men of the Earl of Oxford's, the Kings Regiment of Horse (Blues and Royals), led by Colonel Sir Francis Compton; the King's Own Royal Dragoons; and three troops of the King's Horse Guards (Lifeguards) made up the army.

Royalist force 
The royalist force included the following regiments:
 Royal Regiment of Horse, commanded by Lieutenant General Aubrey de Vere, 20th Earl of Oxford KG
 Queen's Regiment of Horse, commanded by Lieutenant General Sir John Lanier
 King's Own Royal Regiment of Dragoons, commanded by General John Churchill
 1st Regiment of Foot Guards, commanded by Brigadier General Henry Fitzroy, 1st Duke of Grafton KG
 1st Battalion, Earl of Dumbarton's Regiment of Foot, commanded by Lieutenant General Lord George Douglas, 1st Earl of Dumbarton KT

The battle

The Duke eventually led his troops out of Bridgwater at around 10:00 pm to undertake a night-time attack on the King's army. They were guided by Richard Godfrey, the servant of a local farmer, along the old Bristol road towards Bawdrip. With their limited cavalry in the vanguard, they turned south along Bradney Lane and Marsh Lane, and came to the open moor with its deep and dangerous rhynes.

There was a delay while the rhyne was crossed and the first men across startled a royalist patrol. A shot was fired and a horseman from the patrol galloped off to report to Feversham. Lord Grey of Warke led the rebel cavalry forward and they were engaged by the King's Regiment of Horse which alerted the rest of the royalist forces. The superior training of the regular army and their horses enabled them to rout the rebel forces by outflanking them.

Aftermath

Monmouth escaped from the battlefield with Grey and they headed for the south coast disguised as peasants. They were captured near Ringwood, Hampshire. Monmouth was taken to the Tower of London, where he was, after several blows of the axe, beheaded.

A letter written by the Earl of Shaftesbury in 1787 provides more detail as to Monmouth's capture:

After the battle, about 500 of Monmouth's troops were captured and imprisoned in St Mary's Parish Church in Westonzoyland, while others were hunted and shot in the ditches where they were hiding. More were hanged from gibbets erected along the roadside. The royalist troops were rewarded, with Feversham being made a Knight of the Garter, Churchill promoted to Major-General and Henry Shires of the artillery receiving a Knighthood. Other soldiers, particularly those who had been wounded, received allowances ranging from £5 to £80. Some of the wounded were among the first to be treated at the newly opened Royal Hospital Chelsea.

The king sent Lord Chief Justice Jeffreys to round up the Duke's supporters throughout the south-west and try them in the Bloody Assizes at Taunton Castle and elsewhere. About 1,300 people were found guilty, many being transported abroad, while some were executed by drawing and quartering. Daniel Defoe, who would later write the novel Robinson Crusoe, had taken part in the uprising and battle. He was heavily fined by Jeffreys, losing much of his land and wealth. Two brothers Benjamin Hewling, a commander of a troop of horse, and William Hewling, lieutenant of foot, were among those condemned to death. Benjamin Hewling was hanged rather than drawn and quartered following a payment of £1000 by his sister.

James II was overthrown in a coup d'état three years later, in the Glorious Revolution.

Last battle on English soil

The Battle of Sedgemoor is often referred to as the last pitched battle fought on English soil, but this depends on the definition of 'battle', for which there are different interpretations. Other contenders for the title of last English battle include: the Battle of Preston in Lancashire, which was fought on 14 November 1715, during the First Jacobite Rebellion; and the Second Jacobite Rebellion's Clifton Moor Skirmish, near Penrith, Cumberland, on 18 December 1745. The Battle of Culloden, fought on Drumossie Moor to the north-east of Inverness on 16 April 1746, was the last pitched battle fought on British soil.

Cultural references

The Battle of Sedgemoor is depicted in detail at the climax of the plot in Arthur Conan Doyle's historical adventure novel Micah Clarke. The Battle also appears in Blackmore's Lorna Doone, where the hero arrives on the battlefield as the battle is finishing, and is then escorted home by the King's soldiers to safety. Likewise, The Royal Changeling (1998) by John Whitbourn describes the rebellion, with some fantasy elements added. The Battle of Sedgemoor both opens and concludes the novel. A collection of poems (Sedgemoor), exploring the battle and consequences of the rebellion, was written by poet and academic Malcolm Povey and published by Smokestack Books in 2006. The poems move between 1685 and the present day, as a narrative technique. Povey's book received widespread praise, especially for its originality: "Not many poets try something as different and ambitious as this. It deserves to be widely read." The battle is commemorated in Val Wake's poem "Dead Willows Mourn". Val Wake, the Australian born journalist and author, lived in Westonzoyland from 1973 to 1979. Events surrounding the battle occupy the first few chapters of Rafael Sabatini's novel Captain Blood. The battle is also included/mentioned in the beginning of the 1935 movie Captain Blood.

The battle serves as the historical background to a series of murders in the novel "Down Among the Dead" (2020) by Damien Boyd.

The Sealed Knot re-enactment society have re-enacted important parts of the rebellion's campaign, on the 300th anniversary in 1985, and again in 2005. For the first re-enactment, the folk trio Strawhead produced an album of various songs from the time and written especially, entitled 'Sedgemoor'. The Battle of Sedgemoor was also a central plot in the 1972 HTV series Pretenders, which was broadcast in 13 half-hour episodes. A mural depicting the battle can be found on display at Sedgemoor motorway services on the North carriageway of the M5.

References

Further reading
 
 

1685 in England
Conflicts in 1685
Sedgemoor 1685
Military history of Somerset
Registered historic battlefields in England
17th century in Somerset
Monmouth Rebellion